Choi Hyun-wook (born January 30, 2002) is a South Korean actor. In 2019, he began his acting career by leading in the web drama Real:Time:Love. His role in SBS television series Taxi Driver and Racket Boys awarded him the Best New Actor at the 2021 SBS Drama Awards. Recently, he gained more recognition in the tvN drama Twenty-Five Twenty-One and Wavve's Weak Hero Class 1.

Early life and education 
Choi Hyun-wook was born on January 30, 2002. During his childhood, he played baseball for ten years. In his first year of high school, he sustained an elbow injury and underwent surgery and rehabilitation, but it did not improve his condition. Due to the situation, he changed his career path and pursued acting. Eventually, Choi left Gangneung High School as well as his position at the school's baseball team and transferred to Hanlim Multi Art School at Broadcasting & Entertainment Department until he graduated.

Career 

Choi made his debut as an actor on the 2019 WhyNot Media's web series Real: Time: Love, playing the role of Moon Ye-chan. Originally, he wasn't planning to pass the audition for the program, as he only wanted to gain experience. But, to his surprise, he was offered the role.

On March 23, 2020, Gold Medalist confirmed that Choi has been cast for the web drama Pop Out Boy!, based on the popular webtoon of the same name. The series began filming the following month. It started to air on June 25.

In April 2021, Choi appeared in a SBS drama Taxi Driver as Park Seung-tae, a school bully. He was the antagonist on the series' episode 3 and 4. A month earlier, he was selected to star in another SBS drama, Racket Boys. Choi briefly appeared on Jirisan as Lim Cheol-kyeong in a flashback with Seo Yi-kang, one of the main characters.

Filmography

Television series

Web series

Music video appearances

Discography

Soundtrack appearances

Awards and nominations

References

External links 
 Choi Hyun-wook at Gold Medalist 
 
 

2002 births
Living people
21st-century South Korean male actors
South Korean male television actors
South Korean male web series actors
Hanlim Multi Art School alumni